Alex Ridley (born 5 July 1996) is a New Zealand cricketer. He made his List A debut for Wellington in the 2017–18 Ford Trophy on 31 January 2018. He made his first-class debut for Wellington in the 2017–18 Plunket Shield season on 1 March 2018.

References

External links
 

1996 births
Living people
New Zealand cricketers
Place of birth missing (living people)
Wellington cricketers